Popta's buntingi (Adrianichthys poptae) is a endangered species of fish in the family Adrianichthyidae. It is endemic to Lake Poso in Sulawesi, Indonesia. This species was described by Max Carl Wilhelm Weber and Lieven Ferdinand de Beaufort in 1922 and they gave it the species name poptae in honour of their fellow Dutch ichthyologist Canna Maria Louise Popta (1860-1929).

Sources

Popta's buntingi
Taxa named by Max Carl Wilhelm Weber
Taxa named by Lieven Ferdinand de Beaufort
Popta's buntingi
Taxonomy articles created by Polbot
Taxobox binomials not recognized by IUCN